Henri Butel (1 July 1929 – 18 August 2013) was a French rower. He competed in the men's single sculls event at the 1952 Summer Olympics.

References

1929 births
2013 deaths
French male rowers
Olympic rowers of France
Rowers at the 1952 Summer Olympics
Place of birth missing